Shekharipuram (also spelled as Sekharipuram) is a residential area in Palakkad city,Kerala, India. Sekharipuram is famous for its agraharam or also known as heritage village. A road which starts from Sekharipuram usually known as Calicut bypass road is a 4 lane bypass road constructed for the vehicles coming from other parts of Kerala going towards Tamil Nadu side by bypassing Palakkad city.

Temples 
LakshmiNarayana Swamy Temple
Bala Ganapathi Temple
Harihara puthra Swamy Temple
Emoor Bhagavathy Temple
Viswanatha Swamy Temple

Festivals 

The Chariot (Theru) Festival occurs during the month of May.
A major Mahakumbabishekam festival in May 2007 was conducted at the Lakshminarayan Temple.

References

Suburbs of Palakkad
Cities and towns in Palakkad district
Villages in Palakkad district